Fumio Yamamoto (13 November 1962 – 13 October 2021) was a Japanese author.

She was born on 13 November 1962 in Yokohama, as Akemi Omura.

Yamamoto won the 1999  for Loveholic. Her novel Planaria was awarded the Naoki Prize. Yamamoto died on 13 October 2021 of pancreatic cancer in Karuizawa, Nagano, aged 58.

References

1962 births
2021 deaths
Deaths from pancreatic cancer
Deaths from cancer in Japan
21st-century Japanese women writers
20th-century Japanese women writers
Japanese women novelists
Writers from Kanagawa Prefecture
Writers from Nagano Prefecture
People from Karuizawa, Nagano
People from Yokohama
Kanagawa University alumni